Ray Finnegan is a Gaelic footballer for Louth. He plays Gaelic football with his local club St Patrick's Lordship, when he lifted the Joe Ward Cup for the sixth time in 2014 as captain. He was a member of the Louth senior football team since 2004 until he retired in 2013. His younger brother Dessie is also a member of the senior team.

Honours
Tommy Murphy Cup (1): 2006
National Football League, Division 2 (1): 2006
National Football League, Division 3 (1): 2011
Louth Senior Football Championship (6): 2003, 2004, 2007, 2011, 2012, 2014, 2015
Cardinal O'Donnell Cup (5):
Sheelan Cups (2):

References

1983 births
Living people
Irish electricians
Louth inter-county Gaelic footballers
St Patrick's Lordship footballers